Hasselwood Rock is a skerry adjacent to Rockall in the North Atlantic.

Position and characteristics

It is covered at high tide and in heavy seas, often only visible as breaking waves. The only other rocks in the area, those of Helen's Reef, are almost  to the north-east.

Expeditions and landings have not been reported. The geological composition is unknown.

SS Norge disaster
In 1904, the SS Norge ran aground on the Rock in foggy weather with the loss of over 635 lives. The sinking remains the worst maritime disaster involving a Danish merchant ship, and was at the time the worst civilian disaster in the Atlantic Ocean until the sinking of the Titanic eight years later.

References

Skerries of Scotland
Islands of the Outer Hebrides
Volcanoes of Scotland
Rockall